EGLU ((2S)-α-ethylglutamic acid ) is a drug that is used in neuroscience research. It was one of the first compounds found that acts as a selective antagonist for the group II metabotropic glutamate receptors (mGluR2/3), and so has been useful in the characterization and study of this receptor subfamily.

References 

MGlu2 receptor antagonists
MGlu3 receptor antagonists
Amino acids
Dicarboxylic acids